Acilius Glabrio may refer to:

 Manius Acilius Glabrio (disambiguation)
 Marcus Acilius Glabrio (consul 33 BC)
 Anicius Acilius Glabrio Faustus, Roman senator

See also

 
 Acilia gens